Callia metallica is a species of beetle in the family Cerambycidae. It was described by Galileo and Martins in 2008. It is endemic to Ecuador.

References

Calliini
Beetles described in 2008